This is a list of wars and humanitarian conflicts involving the Republic of Belarus and its predecessor states (Principality of Polotsk, Belarusian People's Republic, Byelorussian SSR). Notable militarised interstate disputes are included.

Principality of Polotsk

Russian Empire

Soviet Union

Republic of Belarus

References

list
Belarus
list
Wars